Stefaniada is a mountain village and local community in the western part of the Karditsa regional unit, Thessaly, Greece. Since the 2011 local government reform it is part of the municipality Argithea, under the municipal unit Anatoliki Argithea. The local community has an area of 31.104 km2. The village has a population of 35 and the local community 93 (2011).

References 

Populated places in Karditsa (regional unit)